Major General Donald P. Dunbar is Wisconsin's former Adjutant General. He commanded the Wisconsin National Guard and is in the United States Air National Guard. Dunbar was responsible for Emergency Management in the state. He also served as Wisconsin's Homeland Security Advisor, chairs the Homeland Security Council, and served as the senior state official for cyber matters. Dunbar also served on the executive committees of the Governor's Homeland Security Advisors Council (GHSAC) and the Adjutants General Association of the United States (AGAUS), and is a member of the Federal Emergency Management Agency (FEMA) National Advisory Council.  With the retirement of Major General Thaddeus J. Martin of the Connecticut National Guard on June 30, 2018, General Dunbar became the longest serving Adjutant General in the United States. At the request of Governor Tony Evers, Dunbar resigned his post in the Wisconsin National Guard on December 9, 2019, for intentionally ignoring orders requiring outside investigations into claims of sexual assault and harassment as required by state and federal law and U.S. Department of Defense regulations.

Career
Dunbar joined the Air Force in August 1983 and trained at Reese Air Force Base. Later he would compile over 3,000 flying hours, flying in a Boeing B-52 Stratofortress, Boeing KC-135 Stratotanker, Fairchild C-26 Metroliner, McDonnell Douglas DC-10, Cessna T-37 Tweet, Northrop T-38 Talon, and Cessna T-41 Mescalero. He first came to Wisconsin in March 2005 to command the 128th Air Refueling Wing of the Wisconsin Air National Guard. Following a tour of duty in the Iraq War, Dunbar was named Adjutant General of Wisconsin by Jim Doyle in 2007.

Awards Dunbar has received include the Legion of Merit, the Meritorious Service Medal with four oak leaf clusters, the Air Medal, the Air Force Commendation Medal, the Air Force Achievement Medal, the Army Achievement Medal, the Joint Meritorious Unit Award, the Meritorious Unit Award, the Air Force Organization Excellence Award the Combat Readiness Medal with one silver oak leaf cluster and two bronze oak leaf clusters, the Air Force Recognition Ribbon, the National Defense Service Medal with service star, the Armed Forces Expeditionary Medal with two service stars, the Global War on Terrorism Expeditionary Medal, the Global War on Terrorism Service Medal, the Armed Forces Service Medal with four bronze service stars, the Humanitarian Service Medal,  the Air Force Overseas Ribbon, the Air Force Expeditionary Service Ribbon with gold border and three oak leaf clusters, the Air Force Longevity Service Award with oak leaf cluster, the Armed Forces Reserve Medal with hourglass device and mobilization device with a 7 award numeral, the Small Arms Expert Marksmanship Ribbon, the Air Force Training Ribbon, and the NATO Medal.

Education
B.D., College of Insurance
M.B.A., City University of Seattle
J.D., University of Maryland School of Law
Distinguished Graduate, Squadron Officer School
Graduate, Air Command and Staff College
Distinguished Graduate, National War College
M.S., National War College
Fellow, CAPSTONE Military Leadership Program

Dates of rank
From 1984 to present, Dunbar has achieved eight different rank promotions.

References

Living people
Adjutants General of Wisconsin
National Guard (United States) generals
Military personnel from Wisconsin
United States Air Force personnel of the Iraq War
National War College alumni
Recipients of the Air Medal
Recipients of the Legion of Merit
United States Air Force generals
University of Maryland Francis King Carey School of Law alumni
City University of Seattle alumni
Year of birth missing (living people)